Ruda  is a village in the administrative district of Gmina Dębe Wielkie, within Mińsk County, Masovian Voivodeship, in east-central Poland.

The village has a population of 480.

References

Villages in Mińsk County